The Seattle Rainiers, originally named the Seattle Indians and also known as the Seattle Angels, were a Minor League Baseball team in Seattle, Washington, that played in the Pacific Coast League from 1903 to 1906 and 1919 to 1968. They were initially named for the indigenous Native American population of the Pacific Northwest, and changed their name after being acquired by the Rainier Brewing Company, which was in turn named for nearby Mount Rainier.

History
Along with the Los Angeles Angels, Portland Beavers, Oakland Oaks, Sacramento Solons, and San Francisco Seals the Indians were charter members of the Pacific Coast League which was founded in  after the California League and the Pacific Northwest League merged. They were known in the Pacific Northwest League as the Seattle Clamdiggers. Though the team finished second in 1906, the PCL contracted from six teams to four after the season (mainly due to the failures of the Sacramento franchise). For the next 11 seasons, the Indians played in the Northwest League, at the time a Class B league.

The Indians re-entered the PCL in 1919 with Portland (which had dropped out of the league after 1917), bringing the number of teams in the league to eight. The Indians finished in last place that year, but jumped to second in 1920. In 1924, the Indians won their first PCL pennant, clinching the title on the last day of the 202-game season.

For more than a decade after their championship run, the Indians were mired in the second division year after year. In 1932, their home park, 15,000-seat Dugdale Field, burned to the ground. Located at Rainier and McClellan Streets, it had been built in 1913 when the Indians played in the Northwest League. For the next six years, the team played at Civic Stadium, featuring a playing field of hardpan dirt.

Events took a definite turn for the better in 1938 when Emil Sick, owner of Seattle's Rainier Brewing Company, bought the Indians and renamed them the Seattle Rainiers. He began construction of Sick's Stadium, a 15,000-seat facility on the site of old Dugdale Field. Sick invested in the team, and it bore results. The Rainiers finished first in 1939, 1940 and 1941. They lost the postseason series in 1939, but won pennants in 1940 and 1941. In 1942 and 1943, the Rainiers finished in third place, but did win another PCL pennant in 1942.

After a few lean years, the Rainiers won PCL flags in 1951 and 1955, the last pennants won under Sick's ownership. After the 1960 season, the team was sold to the Boston Red Sox. The Red Sox in turn sold the Rainiers to the Los Angeles/California Angels in 1965, who renamed the team the Seattle Angels, as they were known during their last four seasons.

The last hurrah for the Rainiers-turned-Angels came in 1966, when the Seattle Angels won the championship of the PCL's new Western Division (the PCL had absorbed former American Association teams in the midwestern and southwestern parts of the United States). In the playoffs, the Angels defeated the Eastern Division champion Tulsa Oilers, for Seattle's last PCL pennant.

The team's last year was 1968, in which they finished in eighth place overall. Seattle had been granted an expansion team in the American League, the ill-fated Seattle Pilots, which began play in 1969. The Pilots would last but one year in Seattle, before a bankruptcy court sold the team to a group headed by Bud Selig and were moved to Milwaukee in 1970.

The Class A Rainiers
After the Pilots left, Seattle was without professional baseball for the first time since 1900.  Following a two-year void, a Sacramento man named Art Peterson bought a Class A Northwest League franchise for Seattle, named them the Rainiers and signed a deal to play in Sicks' Stadium (where the team inherited the Pilots' old offices).  The Rainiers played five seasons in the NWL between 1972 and 1976 with two winning teams.

The team was a co-op operation in 1972, drawing players primarily from the San Francisco and Baltimore minor league systems.  Managed by former St. Louis Cardinals pitcher Ray Washburn, the Rainiers went into a tailspin in August and finished last in the NWL North Division.  The Cincinnati Reds picked up Seattle as an affiliate for the next two seasons.  The Rainiers came in with two second-place showings as the team groomed future major league pitchers Manny Sarmiento, Mike Armstrong and outfielder Lynn Jones during that time, as well as manager Greg Riddoch.  Peterson went the independent route for 1975 and 1976, signing his own players.  One of those was outfielder Casey Sander, a Seattle native who played one season in 1975 before embarking upon an acting career, eventually landing a regular role in the longtime ABC-TV sitcom Grace Under Fire.  The 1976 team had the best showing of the Rainiers' five-season run, finishing second by one game to the Portland Mavericks in the NWL's Northern Division.

On September 1, 1976, Seattle shut out Portland 2-0, with local product George Meyring winning the final professional baseball game in Sicks' Stadium.

In 1977, another American League expansion team was awarded to Seattle, the Seattle Mariners.

Season-by-season record

Affiliations
The Seattle Rainiers were affiliated with the following major league teams:

Notable Rainiers alumni

Baseball Hall of Fame alumni

 Bob Lemon (1965-1966, MGR) Inducted, 1976

Notable alumni

 Joe Adcock (1968, MGR) 2 x MLB All-Star
 Joe Black (1957) 1952 NL rookie of the Year
 Sam Bohne (originally "Sam Cohen") (1920), Major League Baseball player
 Jim Bouton (1968) MLB All-Star
 Tommy Bridges (1950) 6 x MLB All-Star
 Lew Burdette (1967) 3 x MLB All-Star; 1957 World Series Most Valuable Player
 George Burns (1933) 1926 AL Most Valuable Player
 Tom Burgmeier (1965-1966) MLB All-Star
 Ryne Duren (1955) 4 x MLB All-Star
 Rollie Hemsley (1948) 5 x MLB All-Star
 Babe Herman (1925)
 Fred Hutchinson (1938) (1955 and 1959, MGR) MLB All-Star; 1957 MLB Manager of the Year
 Jay Johnstone (1966-1968)
 Jim Lonborg (1964) MLB All-Star; 1967 AL Cy Young Award
 Peanuts Lowrey (1959) MLB All-Star
 Jim McGlothlin (1965-1966) MLB All-Star
 Rudy May (1966) 1980 AL ERA Leader
 Andy Messersmith (1966, 1968) 4 x MLB All-Star
 Claude Osteen (1958) 3 x MLB All-Star
 Marty Pattin (1966, 1968) MLB All-Star
 Johnny Pesky (1961-1962, MGR) MLB All-Star
 Rico Petrocelli (1964) 2 x MLB All-Star
 Vada Pinson (1958) 4 x MLB All-Star
 Dick Radatz (1961) 2 x MLB All-Star
 Dutch Ruether (1935-1936, MGR)
 Connie Ryan (1958, MGR) MLB All-Star
 Luke Sewell (1956, MGR) MLB All-Star
 Rip Sewell (1933) 4 x MLB All-Star
 Chuck Tanner (1967, MGR) Manager: 1979 World Series Champion - Pittsburgh Pirates
 Earl Torgeson (1946)
 Sammy White (1949) MLB All-Star
 Maury Wills (1957) 7 x MLB All-Star; 1962 NL Most Valuable Player
 Earl Wilson (1961)
 Wilbur Wood (1963-1964) 3 x MLB All-Star
 Clyde Wright (1967) MLB All-Star

Players
Seattle Rainiers players

Tribute
The Mariners occasionally wear Rainiers uniforms as a "1950s throwback" promotion.

In 1995, the Tacoma Tigers, the Mariners Triple-A affiliate, adopted the Rainiers name and have been using it ever since.

References 

O'Neal, Bill. The Pacific Coast League 1903–1988. Eakin Press, Austin TX, 1990. .
Snelling, Dennis. The Pacific Coast League: A Statistical History, 1903–1957 McFarland & Company, Inc., Jefferson, North Carolina, 1995. .

Professional baseball teams in Washington (state)
Baseball teams established in 1919
Baseball teams disestablished in 1976
Defunct Pacific Coast League teams
Defunct Northwest League teams
Boston Red Sox minor league affiliates
Cincinnati Reds minor league affiliates
California Angels minor league affiliates
Los Angeles Angels minor league affiliates
Defunct baseball teams in Washington (state)
Baseball in Seattle
1919 establishments in Washington (state)
1976 establishments in Washington (state)